Cammy Logan (born 28 January 2002) is a Scottish professional footballer who plays as a defender for Queen of the South, on loan from Heart of Midlothian. Logan has previously had loan spells with Cove Rangers, Edinburgh City and Kelty Hearts.

Club career
Logan debuted for Heart of Midlothian on 13 May 2018, in a 1–0 league defeat away at Kilmarnock. He was one of four Hearts youth players to make their debuts in that match, alongside Chris Hamilton, Leeroy Makovora and Connor Smith.

Logan was loaned to Cove Rangers in January 2021.

On 3 January 2022, Logan joined Scottish League Two side Edinburgh City on loan for the remainder of the season. He was a key part of helping the club gaining promotion to the Scottish League One via the play-offs. 

Logan was loaned to Scottish League One club Kelty Hearts in August 2022. He returned to his parent club in January 2023.

Logan was loaned to Scottish League One club Queen of the South in February 2023.

International career
Logan has represented both Scotland U16 and Scotland U17.

Career statistics

References

2002 births
Living people
Scottish footballers
Heart of Midlothian F.C. players
Scottish Professional Football League players
Scotland youth international footballers
Association football defenders
Cove Rangers F.C. players
F.C. Edinburgh players
Kelty Hearts F.C. players

Queen of the South F.C. players